Ray Johnson and the Bystanders were an American band active from 1955 until 1966. They recorded on Demon Records.

References

American musical groups
Musical groups disestablished in 1966
Musical groups established in 1955
1955 establishments in the United States